Lokmanya Tilak College of Engineering, established in 1994 is an engineering college in Navi Mumbai. The college is affiliated with the University of Mumbai and the official engineering degrees are issued by the same. The college is approved by AICTE, New Delhi and is recognized by the government of Maharashtra. Recognition of some of their engineering programs (Mechanical Engineering and Electronics & Telecommunication Engineering) are accredited by National Board of Accreditation (NBA), India, a full member of the Washington Accord under Engineering Tier II (Under Graduate) Institutions category. The National Assessment and Accreditation Council(NAAC), one of the prime responsible bodies for accreditation of higher education institutions in India, has accredited the college with a B++ grade for the current fiscal year.

History 
The college was established in 1994 under the banner of LTJSS. The institute is named after the Indian freedom fighter Bal Gangadhar Tilak; an eminent, mathematician, great educationist and social reformer.

Other institutions under the LTJSS umbrella include Priyadarshini College of Engineering, an A+ grade NAAC accredited university in Nagpur, and Priyadarshini Institute of Engineering and Technology.

Initially, undergraduate engineering comprised Mechanical, Electrical, and Computer engineering tracks. In 2001, LTCE added the Electronics and Telecommunication engineering department. Postgraduate programs were offered around the mid 2010's. In 2020, three new Computer Science and Engineering specialized departments were introduced due to the growing demand for AI and IoT: 
 Data Science
 Artificial Intelligence and Machine Learning
 IoT and Cyber Security including Block Chain Tech

Admission Criteria

Admissions to First Year B.E. 
Admissions to the BTech program are based on MHT-CET score, followed by CAP Counselling, which is conducted by the State Common Entrance Test Cell, Mumbai. The institute-specific qualifying cutoff is announced after the declaration of MHT-CET results to manage the seat allotment process. The seat allotment process is based on the college cutoff and the candidate's preference for courses and colleges. The cut-offs are generally declared in two rounds of CAP Counselling based on closing ranks for each of the BTech specializations. The cutoffs are released for the home state (Maharashtra) and All India candidates, which are further divided into GOPENS, LOPENS, MI and TFWS categories.

Direct Admission to Second Year 
Candidates should have passed with a First Class or First Class with condonation, post-SSC or post-HSC diploma course in Engineering/Technology.
The diploma coursework should be English medium and belong to any of the below recognized education boards:
 Maharashtra State Board of Technical Education (MSBTE) 
 Any recognized equivalent to the diploma awarded by the MSBTE 
 Dr. Babasaheb Ambedkar Technological University, Lonere (BATU) 
 Any AICTE-approved institution which has been granted academic autonomy by the government of Maharashtra or university in the state of Maharashtra

Postgraduate Admissions 
The admission criteria for Ph.D. is a Master's degree with first class & Qualifying P.E.T. score OR an M.E. with first class & valid GATE score.

Academic Divisions 
LTCE offers undergraduate B.E. courses in various engineering fields. It also offers other postgraduate course degrees(M.E. and PhD.) The total number of undergraduate students per batch is 540.

Undergraduate (B.E.)

Postgraduate (M.E., Ph.D.)
 Mechanical Engineering
 Computer Engineering

Campus and College Life 
The 2.8 acres college campus is located in Koparkhairane and consists of two buildings and a sprawling green field. The college is in walkable proximity to bus stops on the Thane-Belapur road and the Koparkhairane railway station.

The mechanical engineering workshop is located on the ground floor. Computer labs, a well-equipped modern library and a large seminar hall(used frequently for guest seminars, academic conferences, and cultural activities) are located on the fifth level. The library comprises a multimedia lab, providing free access to technical journal papers (IEEE, collection of NPTEL lectures, IETE).

The R&D lab was established in 2004 to encourage and foster in-house research projects. The college is strategically located near reputed industrial brands in Navi Mumbai, such as Dhirubhai Ambani Knowledge City, Siemens, Pfizer, Larson and Toubro, Nocil Limited (part of Dow Chemical Company), Reliance Silicones, Tifil. The students and engineering faculty are actively involved with securing research projects from industries for the final year project thesis.

Student Clubs
 Catharsis: College Magazine
 MESA: Mechanical Engineering Student Association
 Prakalp: Inter-college Project Expo 
 Robocon team: Internal student team participating in ABU Robocon, a highly competitive international robotic competition
 Tantragyan: Project Competition
 TechZephyr: Technical Festival
 WDC: Women Development Cell, an internal club for passionate feminist thinkers
 Zephyr: Annual Cultural Festival held every Spring

Notable Accomplishments
 In 2005, in association with Konkan Railway Corporation the college received a collaborative research project grant, which was successfully completed and delivered in 2008. 
 In 2016, the LTCE team participated in the Asia-Pacific Robot Contest (ABU Robocon) and ranked 23rd in its very first attempt. 
 The ISHRAE (Indian Society of Heating, Refrigerating and Air Conditioning Engineers) student chapter was set up in 2021. Students members of ISHRAE placed first and second in the national level Capture the Facade competition.

The administrative and teaching staff routinely organize multiple seminars and orientations throughout the year, to keep their students polished with the latest technologies.

Student Career Fair & Hiring 
Major recruiters include AWS, Byju's, IBM, Tech Mahindra, Infosys, Capgemini, TCS, Cognizant and Accenture. The complete list of students placed in the 2021-22 fiscal year can be found on the college website. In the 2021-22 fiscal year, 95 companies visited the college for recruiting and hired a total of 230 students. The highest package received by a student that year was around 10LPA.

See also
University of Mumbai
Educational Institutes in Navi Mumbai

References 

University of Mumbai
Engineering colleges in Mumbai
Affiliates of the University of Mumbai
Educational institutions established in 1984
1984 establishments in Maharashtra
Memorials to Bal Gangadhar Tilak
Education in Navi Mumbai